Senior sport (or masters sport or veteran sport) is an age category of sport, that usually contains age groups of those 35 and older. It may concern unaltered or adapted sport activities, with and without competitions.

Competitions
 World Masters Games organized since 1985 every four years.
 European Masters Games organized forv the first time in 2008 and then since 2011 every four years.
 Senior Olympics (Senior Games)
 USATF Masters Outdoor Championships began 1968
 USATF Masters Indoor Championships  began 1975
 World Masters Athletics Championships began 1975

See also
 Masters athletics
 Masters cycling
 Masters swimming
 List of centenarian masters track and field records
 List of world records in masters athletics
 Adapted martial arts

References

External links
 Veteran sport